Heřmanov is the name of several locations in the Czech Republic:

 Heřmanov (Děčín District), a village in the Ústí nad Labem Region
 Heřmanov (Žďár nad Sázavou District), a village in the Vysočina Region